The HFC Bank Stadium ( formally known as ANZ Stadium) is a multi-purpose stadium in Suva, Fiji.

HFC Stadium is used primarily for rugby league, rugby union and football matches, and features a track as well as a pitch suitable for worldwide competition. The stadium has a capacity of 15,000.

Construction and renovations
Originally called Buckhurst Park, the stadium was constructed in 1951 on sixteen hectares of land given by William H. B. Buckhurst in 1948.

The stadium was first renovated in 1978–1979 for the Sixth South Pacific Games. Work commenced in April 1978 with the demolition of the grandstand, which had lost its roof during Hurricane Bebe. The stadium was renamed National Stadium upon reopening in 1979.

A second renovation took place in 2012, sponsored by ANZ Fiji, Fiji's largest bank, at a cost of FJD $17.5 million. The stadium reopened in March 2013, with a rugby union game between the Fiji national team and Classic All Blacks.

In June 2022, the Fiji Sports Council announced HFC Bank as the new naming right sponsor of the stadium with the new name designated as HFC Bank Stadium.

Buckhurst and Bidesi Parks
The 2012–2013 renovation also included the park and playing grounds behind the HFC Bank Stadium, which are known as Bidesi Park and Buckhurst Park, retaining the stadium's original name. The Buckhurst and Bidesi grounds include three pitches primarily used for training and competition in rugby league, rugby union, football, and cricket, and a small stadium and synthetic training track. Buckhurst Park was the site of the National Baseball Diamond used in the 2003 South Pacific Games.

See also

List of rugby league stadiums by capacity
List of rugby union stadiums by capacity

References

External links

Fiji national rugby union team
Athletics (track and field) venues in Fiji
Football venues in Fiji
Rugby league stadiums in Fiji
Rugby union stadiums in Fiji
Indoor arenas in Fiji
Fiji
Multi-purpose stadiums in Fiji
Sports venues completed in 1951
Sports venues completed in 1979
Sports venues completed in 2013
World Rugby Sevens Series venues
Buildings and structures in Suva
Sport in Suva
Fijian Drua